Pollenia mediterranea is a species of cluster fly in the family Polleniidae.

Distribution
Israel, Italy.

References

Polleniidae
Insects described in 1966
Diptera of Asia
Diptera of Europe